Savoyard is an Arpitan language of the Franco-Provençal family. It is spoken in some territories of the historical Duchy of Savoy, nowadays a geographic area spanning Savoie and Haute-Savoie, France and the Canton of Geneva, Switzerland. It has around 35,000 speakers today.

Some words 
Several subdialects of Savoyard exist that exhibit unique features in terms of phonetics and vocabulary. This includes many words that have to do with the weather: bacan (French: temps mauvais); coussie (French: tempête); royé (French: averse); ni[v]ole (French: nuage); ...and, the environment: clapia, perrier (French: éboulis); égra (French: sorte d'escalier de pierre); balme (French: grotte); tova (French: tourbière); and lanche (French: champ en pente).

Linguistic studies
Savoyard has been the subject of detailed study at the Centre de dialectologie of the Stendhal University, Grenoble, currently under the direction of Michel Contini.

See also
Languages of France

References

Notes 

Franco-Provençal language
Languages of France
Arpitania